Anna Levandi, née Kondrashova, (born 30 June 1965) is a Russian competitive figure skater who represented the former Soviet Union in international competition. She was the 1984 World silver medalist and four-time European bronze medalist. She competed at two Winter Olympic Games.

Levandi was born Anna Anatolevna Kondrashova, and grew up, in Moscow, Russia (then Soviet Union). She is married to Allar Levandi, an Estonian former Olympic Nordic combined skier. The couple lives in Estonia and she now works as a coach in Tallinn. Their son, Arlet Levandi, is a figure skater who competes for Estonia.

Competitive career 
Kondrashova began competing at senior ISU events in 1983. She won the silver medal at the 1984 World Figure Skating Championships, which was a controversial result and had the Canadian crowd booing. She did however produce three clean triples in her free programme: two toe-loops and a triple loop. She won four bronze medals at the European Figure Skating Championships: in 1984, and from 1986 through 1988.

She represented the Soviet Union at the 1984 Winter Olympics, where she placed 5th, and the Soviet Union at the 1988 Winter Olympics, where she placed 8th. She retired from competitive skating following that season.

Coaching career
Levandi works as a coach and choreographer at Anna Levandi Figure Skating Club in Tallinn. Among her current and former students and choreography clients are 
Johanna Allik,
Jasmine Alexandra Costa,
Alisa Drei,
Jelena Glebova,
Mari Hirvonen,
Christian Horvath
Svetlana Issakova, 
Taru Karvosenoja,
Viktor Romanenkov,
Viktoria Shklover & Valdis Mintals,
Dmitri Tchumak,
and Eva-Lotta Kiibus.

Honors and awards
In 2007, she was named Woman of the Year of Estonia and in 2008 Coach of the Year of Estonia. On 4 February 2009, she was decorated with the Third Class Order of the White Star.

Results

Notes

References

External links

 
 Anna Levandi Iluuisutamisklubi, treener Anna Levandi

1965 births
Living people
Figure skaters from Moscow
Soviet female single skaters
Figure skaters at the 1984 Winter Olympics
Figure skaters at the 1988 Winter Olympics
Olympic figure skaters of the Soviet Union
Russian figure skating coaches
Russian expatriates in Estonia
Russian emigrants to Estonia
Soviet emigrants to Estonia
World Figure Skating Championships medalists
European Figure Skating Championships medalists
Russians in Estonia
Female sports coaches
Estonian female single skaters
Recipients of the Order of the White Star, 3rd Class